Üügu Landscape Conservation Area is a nature reserve situated on Muhu Island, Saare County, Estonia.

The protected area was designated in 1959 to protect Üügu Cliff and its surroundings. In 2019, the protected area was redesigned to the landscape conservation area.

References

Nature reserves in Estonia
Geography of Saare County